Miha Baloh (21 May 1928 – 6 December 2022) was a Slovene actor. He started participating in local theatre productions after the Second World War and eventually enrolled in the AGRFT in Ljubljana, from where he graduated in 1952. In 1953, he began collaboration with the Permanent Slovene Theatre in Trieste. There he worked with the director Jože Babič who also offered him his first major film role. From 1967, he also worked on international productions on projects such as the Austrian TV comedy series Leni, German films on Winnetou and a French-German series on Omer Pasha. He continued to work in the theatre throughout his career.

Baloh died on 6 December 2022, at the age of 94.

Filmography

References

External links 

1928 births
2022 deaths
20th-century Slovenian male actors
Golden Arena winners
University of Ljubljana alumni
People from Jesenice, Jesenice
Slovenian male film actors
Slovenian male stage actors
Slovenian male television actors